Chamseddine Harrag (born 10 August 1992) is an Algerian footballer who plays for Saudi club Wej.

Career 
Harrag started his professional career at USM El Harrach on 1 July 2013 and played in 3 matches, The 13/14 season Harrag played for only 2 minutes. Harrag's third season was his breakthrough season playing 19 games and 1,211 minutes. During his 4th season he played in 28 games (2,506 minutes), scoring 2 goals and 2 assists as a left-Back. His fifth season was another great one playing in 25 matches scoring 3 goals and getting 2 assists, he also got called up for Algerian national team. Next season he played 25 games and scored 1 and got himself 8 assist.

On 20 January 2023, Harrag joined Saudi Arabian club Wej.

References 

Living people
1992 births
Algerian footballers
USM El Harrach players
NA Hussein Dey players
MC Alger players
Wej SC players
Saudi Second Division players
Association football midfielders
21st-century Algerian people
Expatriate footballers in Saudi Arabia
Algerian expatriates in Saudi Arabia